In chemistry, an interhalogen compound is a molecule which contains two or more different halogen atoms (fluorine, chlorine, bromine, iodine, or astatine) and no atoms of elements from any other group. 

Most interhalogen compounds known are binary (composed of only two distinct elements). Their formulae are generally , where n = 1, 3, 5 or 7, and X is the less electronegative of the two halogens. The value of n in interhalogens is always odd, because of the odd valence of halogens. They are all prone to hydrolysis, and ionize to give rise to polyhalogen ions. Those formed with astatine have a very short half-life due to astatine being intensely radioactive.

No interhalogen compounds containing three or more different halogens are definitely known, although a few books claim that  and  have been obtained, and theoretical studies seem to indicate that some compounds in the series  are barely stable.

Beyond that, iodine monochloride has several applications, including helping to measure the saturation of fats and oils, and as a catalyst for some reactions. A number of interhalogens, including , are used to form polyhalides.

Similar compounds exist with various pseudohalogens, such as the halogen azides (and ) and cyanogen halides (and ).

Types of interhalogens

Diatomic interhalogens

The interhalogens of form XY have physical properties intermediate between those of the two parent halogens. The covalent bond between the two atoms has some ionic character, the less electronegative halogen, X, being oxidised and having a partial positive charge. All combinations of fluorine, chlorine, bromine, and iodine that have the above-mentioned general formula are known, but not all are stable. Some combinations of astatine with other halogens are not even known, and those that are known are highly unstable.

Chlorine monofluoride (ClF) is the lightest interhalogen compound. ClF is a colorless gas with a normal boiling point of −100 °C.
Bromine monofluoride (BrF) has not been obtained as a pure compound — it dissociates into the trifluoride and free bromine. It is created according to the following equation:
Br2(l) + F2(g) → 2 BrF(g)
Bromine monofluoride dissociates like this:
3 BrF → Br2 + BrF3

Iodine monofluoride (IF) is unstable and decomposes at 0 °C, disproportionating into elemental iodine and iodine pentafluoride.
Bromine monochloride (BrCl) is a yellow-brown gas with a boiling point of 5 °C. 
Iodine monochloride (ICl) exists as red transparent crystals that melt at 27.2 °C to form a choking brownish liquid (similar in appearance and weight to bromine). It reacts with HCl to form the strong acid HICl2. The crystal structure of iodine monochloride consists of puckered zig-zag chains, with strong interactions between the chains. 
Astatine monochloride (AtCl) is made either by the direct combination of gas-phase astatine with chlorine or by the sequential addition of astatine and dichromate ion to an acidic chloride solution.
Iodine monobromide (IBr) is made by the direct combination of the elements to form a dark red crystalline solid. It melts at 42 °C and boils at 116 °C to form a partially dissociated vapour. 
Astatine monobromide (AtBr) is made by the direct combination of astatine with either bromine vapour or an aqueous solution of iodine monobromide.
Astatine monoiodide (AtI) is made by direct combination of astatine and iodine.

No astatine fluorides have been discovered yet. Their absence has been speculatively attributed to the extreme reactivity of such compounds, including the reaction of an initially formed fluoride with the walls of the glass container to form a non-volatile product. Thus, although the synthesis of an astatine fluoride is thought to be possible, it may require a liquid halogen fluoride solvent, as has already been used for the characterization of radon fluorides.

In addition, there exist analogous molecules involving pseudohalogens, such as the cyanogen halides.

Tetratomic interhalogens

Chlorine trifluoride (ClF3) is a colourless gas that condenses to a green liquid, and freezes to a white solid. It is made by reacting chlorine with an excess of fluorine at 250 °C in a nickel tube. It reacts more violently than fluorine, often explosively. The molecule is planar and T-shaped. It is used in the manufacture of uranium hexafluoride.
Bromine trifluoride (BrF3) is a yellow-green liquid that conducts electricity — it self-ionises to form [BrF2]+ and [BrF4]−. It reacts with many metals and metal oxides to form similar ionised entities; with other metals, it forms the metal fluoride plus free bromine and oxygen; and with water, it forms hydrofluoric acid and hydrobromic acid. It is used in organic chemistry as a fluorinating agent. It has the same molecular shape as chlorine trifluoride.
Iodine trifluoride (IF3) is a yellow solid that decomposes above −28 °C. It can be synthesised from the elements, but care must be taken to avoid the formation of IF5. F2 attacks I2 to yield IF3 at −45 °C in CCl3F. Alternatively, at low temperatures, the fluorination reaction
I2 + 3 XeF2 → 2 IF3 + 3 Xe
can be used. Not much is known about iodine trifluoride as it is so unstable.
Iodine trichloride (ICl3) forms lemon yellow crystals that melt under pressure to a brown liquid. It can be made from the elements at low temperature, or from iodine pentoxide and hydrogen chloride. It reacts with many metal chlorides to form tetrachloroiodides, and hydrolyses in water. The molecule is a planar dimer (ICl3)2, with each iodine atom surrounded by four chlorine atoms.
Iodine tribromide (IBr3) is a dark brown liquid.

Hexatomic interhalogens

All stable hexatomic and octatomic interhalogens involve a heavier halogen combined with five or seven fluorine atoms. Unlike the other halogens, fluorine atoms have high electronegativity and small size which is able to stabilize them.
Chlorine pentafluoride (ClF5) is a colourless gas, made by reacting chlorine trifluoride with fluorine at high temperatures and high pressures. It reacts violently with water and most metals and nonmetals.
Bromine pentafluoride (BrF5) is a colourless fuming liquid, made by reacting bromine trifluoride with fluorine at 200 °C. It is physically stable, but decomposes violently on contact with water, organic substances, and most metals and nonmetals.
Iodine pentafluoride (IF5) is a colourless liquid, made by reacting iodine pentoxide with fluorine, or iodine with silver(II) fluoride. It is highly reactive, even slowly with glass. It reacts with water to form hydrofluoric acid and with fluorine gas to form iodine heptafluoride. The molecule has the form of a tetragonal pyramid.

Octatomic interhalogens

Iodine heptafluoride (IF7) is a colourless gas and a strong fluorinating agent. It is made by reacting iodine pentafluoride with fluorine gas. The molecule is a pentagonal bipyramid. This compound is the only known interhalogen compound where the larger atom is carrying seven of the smaller atoms.
All attempts to synthesize bromine or chlorine heptafluoride have met with failure; instead, bromine pentafluoride or chlorine pentafluoride is produced, along with fluorine gas.

Properties
Typically, interhalogen bonds are more reactive than diatomic halogen bonds—because interhalogen bonds are weaker than diatomic halogen bonds, except for F2. If interhalogens are exposed to water, they convert to halide and oxyhalide ions. With BrF5, this reaction can be explosive. If interhalogens are exposed to silicon dioxide, or metal oxides, then silicon or metal respectively bond with one of the types of halogen, leaving free diatomic halogens and diatomic oxygen. Most interhalogens are halogen fluorides, and all but three (IBr, AtBr, and AtI) of the remainder are halogen chlorides. Chlorine and bromine can each bond to five fluorine atoms, and iodine can bond to seven. AX and AX3 interhalogens can form between two halogens whose electronegativities are relatively close to one another. When interhalogens are exposed to metals, they react to form metal halides of the constituent halogens. The oxidation power of an interhalogen increases with the number of halogens attached to the central atom of the interhalogen, as well as with the decreasing size of the central atom of the compound. Interhalogens containing fluorine are more likely to be volatile than interhalogens containing heavier halogens.

Interhalogens with one or three halogens bonded to a central atom are formed by two elements whose electronegativities are not far apart. Interhalogens with five or seven halogens bonded to a central atom are formed by two elements whose sizes are very different. The number of smaller halogens that can bond to a large central halogen is guided by the ratio of the atomic radius of the larger halogen over the atomic radius of the smaller halogen. A number of interhalogens, such as IF7, react with all metals except for those in the platinum group. IF7, unlike interhalogens in the XY5 series, does not react with the fluorides of the alkali metals.

ClF3 is the most reactive of the XY3 interhalogens. ICl3 is the least reactive. BrF3 has the highest thermal stability of the interhalogens with four atoms. ICl3 has the lowest. Chlorine trifluoride has a boiling point of −12 °C. Bromine trifluoride has a boiling point of 127 °C and is a liquid at room temperature. Iodine trichloride melts at 101 °C.

Most interhalogens are covalent gases. Some interhalogens, especially those containing bromine, are liquids, and most iodine-containing interhalogens are solids. Most of the interhalogens composed of lighter halogens are fairly colorless, but the interhalogens containing heavier halogens are deeper in color due to their higher molecular weight. In this respect, the interhalogens are similar to the halogens. The greater the difference between the electronegativities of the two halogens in an interhalogen, the higher the boiling point of the interhalogen. All interhalogens are diamagnetic. The bond length of interhalogens in the XY series increases with the size of the constituent halogens. For instance, ClF has a bond length of 1.628 Å, and IBr has a bond length of 2.47 Å.

Production
It is possible to produce larger interhalogens, such as ClF3, by exposing smaller interhalogens, such as ClF, to pure diatomic halogens, such as F2. This method of production is especially useful for generating halogen fluorides. At temperatures of 250 to 300 °C, this type of production method can also convert larger interhalogens into smaller ones. It is also possible to produce interhalogens by combining two pure halogens at various conditions. This method can generate any interhalogen save for IF7.

Smaller interhalogens, such as ClF, can form by direct reaction with pure halogens. For instance, F2 reacts with Cl2 at 250 °C to form two molecules of ClF. Br2 reacts with diatomic fluorine in the same way, but at 60 °C. I2 reacts with diatomic fluorine at only 35 °C. ClF and BrF can both be produced by the reaction of a larger interhalogen, such as ClF3 or BrF3 and a diatomic molecule of the element lower in the periodic table. Among the hexatomic interhalogens, IF5 has a higher boiling point (97 °C) than BrF5 (40.5 °C), although both compounds are liquids at room temperature. The interhalogen IF7 can be formed by reacting palladium iodide with fluorine.

See also
 Interchalcogen
 Hydrogen halide

Notes

References

Bibliography

External links